The Sungai Buloh Prison is a prison complex in Selayang, Selangor, Malaysia. It is the largest prison complex in Malaysia. Started in 1992, completed in October 1996 and opened in November 1996 to replace the Pudu Prison, Kuala Lumpur.

Famous inmates
Anwar Ibrahim - a Malaysian politician who served sentences - for a corruption and two sodomy convictions - from 1998 to 2004, and 2015 to 2018.

References

Buildings and structures in Selangor
Prisons in Malaysia
1996 establishments in Malaysia